Nowell Rhys Fulber is a Canadian electronic musician and producer. He is a member of Front Line Assembly and Delerium, along with Bill Leeb. He also records under his own name and under the name Conjure One.

Biography 
Rhys Fulber was born in Vancouver, Canada on October 10, 1970. His father, a musician, was born in Germany and his mother was from Great Britain. His father introduced him to the music of Led Zeppelin and Kraftwerk (and took him along to see Kraftwerk live in 1975). Fulber became interested in music and started drumming on his father's instruments at a very early age.  

His father later built and ran a recording studio, catering toward the local punk rock scene. As a youth, Fulber spent a lot of time at the studio. In 1984 he started becoming more interested in electronic music and acquired his first synthesizer.

In 1986, he became friends with Bill Leeb, who had just left his former band Skinny Puppy. 

Fulber is a first cousin of Shawn Atleo (Ahousaht First Nation), a Canadian activist and politician, who was elected twice as national chief of the Assembly of First Nations, serving 2009 into 2014.

Early music career 
Fulber's first involvements in Front Line Assembly were one song on their second cassette release Total Terror, and then three songs on The Initial Command. He also contributed to Delerium's debut album, Faces, Forms & Illusions. During this time he started the band Will together with Chris Peterson, John McRae and Jeff Stoddard, which lasted from 1987 to 1992.

He joined Front Line Assembly for their first tour, Gashed Senses & Crossfire in 1989. He then joined Delerium full-time when Michael Balch left. Until 1997, Fulber was involved in all Front Line Assembly, Delerium and side projects with Bill Leeb, including the albums Tactical Neural Implant and Hard Wired from Front Line Assembly, and Semantic Spaces and Karma from Delerium.

Leeb and Fulber released several albums as Synæsthesia, including Embody, Desideratum and Ephemeral.

Fulber was nominated for the Jack Richardson Producer Of The Year award at the 2008 Juno Awards and won two Junos with Delerium for Best Dance Recording in 1998 and 2000.

Discography
This section lists only regular full studio albums.

Under his own name
 Your Dystopia, My Utopia (Sonic Groove, 2018)
 Ostalgia (Sonic Groove, 2019)
 Diaspora (aufnahme + wiedergabe, 2020)
 Resolve (FR Recordings, 2020)
 Brutal Nature (FR Recordings, 2021)
 Collapsing Empires (Sonic Groove, 2022)

Conjure One
Conjure One (Nettwerk, 2002)
Extraordinary Ways (Nettwerk, 2005)
Exilarch (Nettwerk, 2010)
Holoscenic (Armada Music, 2015)
Innovation Zero (Black Hole Recordings, 2022)

Delerium
 Morpheus (Dossier, 1989)
 Syrophenikan (Dossier, 1990)
 Stone Tower (Dossier, 1991)
 Spiritual Archives (Dossier, 1991)
 Spheres (Dossier, 1994)
 Semantic Spaces (Nettwerk, 1994)
 Spheres II (Dossier, 1994)
 Karma (Nettwerk, 1997)
 Chimera (Nettwerk, 2003)
 Nuages du Monde (Nettwerk, 2006)
 Music Box Opera (Nettwerk, 2012)
 Mythologie (Metropolis, 2016)

Fauxliage
 Fauxliage (Nettwerk, 2007)

Front Line Assembly
 The Initial Command (Third Mind, 1987)
 Caustic Grip (Third Mind, 1990)
 Tactical Neural Implant (Third Mind, 1992)
 Millennium (Roadrunner, 1994)
 Hard Wired (Off Beat, 1995)
 Civilization (Metropolis, 2004)
 Artificial Soldier (Metropolis, 2006)
 Wake Up the Coma (Metropolis, 2019)
 Mechanical Soul (Metropolis, 2021)

Intermix
 Intermix (Third Mind, 1992)
 Phaze Two (Third Mind, 1992)
 Future Primitives (ESP-Sun, 1995)

Noise Unit
 Response Frequency (Antler-Subway, 1990)
 Strategy of Violence (Dossier, 1992)
 Decoder (Dossier, 1995)
 Drill (Off Beat, 1996)
 Deviator (Artoffact, 2021)

Synæsthesia
 Embody (Cleopatra, 1995)
 Desideratum (Hypnotic, 1995)
 Ephemeral (Hypnotic, 1997)

Will
 Pearl of Great Price (Third Mind, 1991)

Production 
As Front Line Assembly was beginning to peak, their UK label Third Mind was bought out by Roadrunner Records, a predominantly metal label.  An up-and-coming band on the label Fear Factory was looking to expand their sound with remixes and new label mates Front Line Assembly were contacted.  This led to the influential Fear Is the Mindkiller EP.  From this more metal themed work followed while Fulber was contracted to contribute keyboards and de facto additional production to Fear Factory's breakthrough Demanufacture album, defining their signature sound. Fulber had also contributed backing tracks around this same time to new Canadian industrial rock band Econoline Crush, leading to their signing with EMI Canada and eventually his first full length production job handling their debut album Affliction, spawning minor Canadian rock radio hit "Wicked".  From there his production career grew and became more varied.  The later success of Delerium bringing him into more adult music formats with artists like Josh Groban and Serena Ryder. Based out of Los Angeles since 2000, he currently works out of his own studio, Surplus Sound in Van Nuys.

Selected production credits

For musicians
1993: Fear Factory - Fear Is the Mindkiller (remixing)
1994: Econoline Crush - Purge (programming, keyboards)
1995: Fear Factory - Demanufacture (programming, keyboards, mixing, co-writing)
1995: Machine Head - Old (remixing)
1995: Econoline Crush - Affliction (production, keyboards, programming)
1995: Nailbomb - Proud to Commit Commercial Suicide (keyboards, programming)
1996: Front Line Assembly and Die Krupps - The Remix Wars: Strike 2 (remixing)
1996: The Tea Party - Alhambra (remixing)
1997: Fear Factory - Remanufacture - Cloning Technology (remixing)
1997: Waltari - Space Avenue (producing, programming)
1998: Skinny Puppy - Remix Dystemper (remixing)
1998: Fear Factory - Obsolete (producing, programming, keyboards, co writing)
1998: Cubanate - Interference (producing, programming, keyboards)
2000: Factory 81 - Mankind (remixing)
2001: The Watchmen - Slomotion (producing, programming, keyboards)
2001: Josh Groban - Josh Groban (producing, programming)
2001: Fear Factory - Digimortal (producing, programming, keyboards, co writing)
2002: Paradise Lost - Symbol of Life (producing, programming, keyboards)
2004: Collide - Vortex (remixing)
2004: L'Âme Immortelle - Gezeiten (producing, programming, keyboards)
2004: Fear Factory - Archetype (programming, keyboards, co writing)
2005: Paradise Lost - Paradise Lost (producing, programming, keyboards)
2007: Paradise Lost - In Requiem (producing, keyboards)
2009: Divine Heresy - Bringer of Plagues (keyboards
2010: Fear Factory - Mechanize (producing, programming, keyboards, co writing)
2012: Fear Factory - The Industrialist (producing, programming, keyboards, engineering, co writing)
2013: Mindless Self Indulgence - How I Learned to Stop Giving a Shit and Love Mindless Self Indulgence (mixing, additional production, engineering, co writing)
2013: Scar the Martyr - Scar the Martyr (producing, keyboards, programming)
2014: Machine Head - Bloodstone & Diamonds (string arrangements, keyboards, percussion)
2015: Fear Factory - Genexus (producing, programming, keyboards, engineering) 
2016: Youth Code - Commitment to Complications (producing, mixing, engineering, additional programming, additional keyboards)
2018: Machine Head - Catharsis (programming, string arrangements) 
2018: Three Days Grace - Outsider (keyboards, programming)

For other media
2000: Gun Shy (additional score)
2002: Coors Light - "Rock On"
2006: Justice (theme programming)
2020: Cyberpunk 2077'' (two tracks for game play)

References

External links

Full list of production credits, at official Nettwerk site

Canadian electronic musicians
Canadian industrial musicians
Trip hop musicians
Canadian record producers
Canadian people of German descent
Canadian people of British descent
Musicians from Vancouver
1970 births
Living people
Front Line Assembly members
Delerium members
Will (band) members
Noise Unit members
Nailbomb members